Planctopirus hydrillae is a Gram-negative bacterium from the genus of Planctopirus which has been isolated from the plant Hydrilla verticillata from Hyderabad in India.

References

Bacteria described in 2018
Planctomycetota